Vivarium is a 2019 science fiction film directed by Lorcan Finnegan, from a story by Finnegan and Garret Shanley. An international co-production between Ireland, Denmark and Belgium, it stars Imogen Poots and Jesse Eisenberg. It premiered at the Cannes Film Festival on 18 May 2019, and was released in Ireland on 27 March 2020 by Vertigo Releasing. The film follows a couple (Eisenberg and Poots) that is forced to care for a mysterious child while trapped in a seemingly perfect neighbourhood.

Plot
The opening scene depicts the lifecycle of cuckoos before introducing primary school teacher Gemma and her handyman boyfriend Tom. They drive to meet with estate agent Martin and follow him to a suburban development of identical houses called Yonder. Martin shows them around house number 9. He asks if they have children, and when Gemma replies, "No, not yet", he mimics her perfectly. After looking around the garden they find Martin has vanished. Attempting to leave, they repeatedly find themselves back at number 9. They drive around the endless, identical streets until they run out of gasoline. 

They sleep in the house. The next morning, they try to escape on foot, but consistently return to number 9. They find a box of tasteless vacuum-packed food in front of the house. Tom sets fire to the house and they sleep on the pavement. When they awake another box has been left, containing an infant and the message, "Raise the child and be released." When the smoke clears, the house is undamaged.

98 days later, the infant is the size of a ten year-old boy and mimics Tom and Gemma. Gemma and Tom wait in the garden with a pickaxe to attack whoever delivers the food, but they never see anyone. Tom starts digging a hole in the garden and becomes withdrawn. In the living room, the Boy watches fractal-like patterns on the television.

Tom locks the Boy in their car to starve it, thinking if someone comes for the body they could force them to free them. However, Gemma takes pity and releases it. One day the Boy goes missing, and returns with a book full of symbols and images of humanoids with throat sacs. When Gemma asks him to mimic the person who gave him the book, he makes rasping sounds and inflates his own throat sacs.

The Boy matures to resemble a young adult. Tom and Gemma avoid him and Tom becomes ill. The Boy leaves during the day and Gemma tries to follow him but always finds herself back at number 9. Tom continues to dig and finds a body in a vacuum bag. The Boy locks Gemma and Tom out of the house and they sleep in the car. Gemma pleads with the Boy for medicine for Tom but he replies, "Maybe it's time he was released." When Tom dies the Boy zips him into a vacuum bag and throws it into the hole Tom has dug.

Some time later, Gemma hides in the car, and manages to wound the Boy with the pickaxe when he exits the house. The Boy hisses and crawls into a labyrinth under the pavement. Gemma follows it and crashes through the door into multiple rooms in other houses with more Boys and several strangers, one of whom has died by suicide.

She lands back in number 9, weak and moaning. The Boy is cleaning the house. He carries her to a vacuum bag explaining that mothers die after raising their sons. The boy zips her into a vacuum bag, but before she dies, she manages to tell the Boy, "I'm not your fucking mother." The Boy buries her with Tom and fills in the hole. He drives back to the estate office, where an aged Martin lies dying in his chair. Martin gives The Boy his name tag and expires. The Boy puts Martin in a vacuum bag and puts it into a file drawer. When a couple walks in the door, the Boy greets them just as Martin did.

Cast

Production
In May 2018, it was announced that Lorcan Finnegan would direct Vivarium from a story he co-wrote with Garret Shanley, and that Jesse Eisenberg and Imogen Poots had joined the cast. It was shot in locations in Belgium and Ireland before moving to Ardmore Studios, Wicklow, Ireland.

Release
Vivarium premiered at the Cannes Film Festival on 18 May 2019. Shortly after, Saban Films and Vertigo Releasing acquired US and UK distribution rights, respectively. It was released in the United States, UK and Ireland on 27 March 2020, with a limited theatrical release and video-on-demand release the same day.

Reception
The site's critics consensus reads, "Vivarium may confound almost as often as it intrigues, but this well-acted sci-fi/horror hybrid has interesting ideas—and explores them with style." On Metacritic, the film has weighted average score of 64 out of 100 based on reviews from 23 critics, indicating "generally favorable reviews".

See also
Stopover in a Quiet Town

References

External links
 
 

2019 films
2019 horror thriller films
2019 psychological thriller films
2019 independent films
2019 science fiction films
2010s English-language films
2010s psychological horror films
2010s science fiction horror films
2010s science fiction thriller films
Belgian horror thriller films
Belgian science fiction thriller films
Danish science fiction horror films
Danish science fiction thriller films
English-language Belgian films
English-language Danish films
English-language Irish films
Films about adoption
Films about dysfunctional families
Films about educators
Films shot in Belgium
Films shot in the Republic of Ireland
Irish horror thriller films
Irish science fiction horror films
Irish science fiction thriller films